is a passenger railway station in the city of Maebashi, Gunma Prefecture, Japan, operated by the private railway operator Jōmō Electric Railway Company.

Lines

Station layout
Araya Station is an unattended station consisting of a single side platform serving traffic in both directions.

Adjacent stations

History
Araya Station was opened on November 10, 1928.

Surrounding area
The station is located in a suburban residential area.

See also
 List of railway stations in Japan

External links

  
	

Stations of Jōmō Electric Railway
Railway stations in Gunma Prefecture
Railway stations in Japan opened in 1928
Maebashi